Lu Yen-hsun was the three-time defending champion, but lost to Germain Gigounon in the first round.
Dušan Lajović won the title when Julian Reister withdrew with an illness.

Seeds

Main draw

Finals

Top half

Bottom half

References 
 Main draw
 Qualifying draw

Samsung Securities Cup - Men's Singles
2013 Men's Singles